COMELEC or Comelec may refer to any of the following:

 Commission on Elections (Philippines) (Comelec)
 North African Power Pool: Comité Maghrébin de l'Electricité (COMELEC)